Konstantinos Lagoumitzis (1781–1851) was a Greek revolutionary during the Greek War of Independence (1821–1830), famous for his ability to dig tunnels during sieges.

Lagoumitzis was born in the village of Hormovo, in modern Albania, then part of the Ottoman Empire; though, his family was originally from the village of Lekli. His real surname was either Papakyriakos (Παπακυριάκος) or Dalaropoulos (Νταλαρόπουλος), but he was also called Hormovitis (Χορμοβίτης; from Hormovo). He is mainly known as Lagoumitzis (sapper) due to his successful ability to dig tunnels beneath the camps of enemies and blow them up.

His successes during the siege of Messolonghi and the siege of the Acropolis (1826–27), made him famous. During these sieges, Lagoumitzis successfully countermined the Turkish besiegers.

He died in Athens, in 1851; the Greek state paid for his funeral.

Footnotes

References

Athens Alive, Or, The Practical Tourist's Companion to the Fall of Man. Kevin Andrews. Hermes, 1979.
Makrigiannis' memoirs (in Greek).

1781 births
1827 deaths
Greek people of the Greek War of Independence
Greek revolutionaries
People from Tepelenë